The Autovía A-8 is a highway (autovía) that connects all the regions on the Northern Coast of Spain. It is known as the Autovía del Cantábrico (also known as "Transcantábrica") and connects Baamonde (Begonte, Galicia) and Bilbao, where it continues as the Autopista AP-8 to the French border. The road passes Ribadeo, Avilés, Gijón, Santander and Bilbao.

Bilbao area
Currently the A-8 is also the main beltway of the Greater Bilbao conurbation, which has about a million inhabitants in the metropolitan area. This causes great traffic congestion along the stretch of 30 kilometres of the highway that passes by Bilbao and its metropolitan area, from Galdakao to Muskiz.

Supersur
A new toll by-pass of the city, known as Supersur is being built. The by-pass will be 36 km long and most of its length will be tunnels under the Pagasarri range, as there is no physical space to build it elsewhere.

Gallery

References

External links
Autovía A-8 in Google Maps

A-8
A-8
A-8
A-8